The men's road race at the 1968 UCI Road World Championships was the 35th edition of the event. The race took place on Sunday 1 September 1968 in Imola, Italy. The race was won by Vittorio Adorni of Italy after a successful 90 km breakaway from the leading group on the 4th lap.

Final classification

References

Men's Road Race
UCI Road World Championships – Men's road race
1968 Super Prestige Pernod